Dimitri of Yugoslavia may refer to:

 Prince Dimitri of Yugoslavia (b. 1958), son of Prince Alexander of Yugoslavia
 Prince Dimitri of Yugoslavia (b. 1965), son of Prince Andrej of Yugoslavia